Gian Luigi Polidoro (4 February 1927 – 7 September 2000) was an Italian film director and screenwriter. He directed 16 films between 1956 and 1998. His 1963 film Il diavolo won the Golden Bear at the 13th Berlin International Film Festival.

Filmography

Director
 La Corsa delle Rocche (1956)
 Power Among Men (1958)
 Paese d'America (1958)
 Oeuverture (1958)
 Le svedesi (1960)
 Hong Kong un addio (1963)
 Il diavolo (1963)
 Thrilling (1965)
 Una moglie americana (1965)
 La moglie giapponese (1968)
 Satyricon (1969)
 Fischia il sesso (1974)
 Permettete, signora, che ami vostra figlia (1974)
 Rent Control (1984)
 Sottozero (1987)
 Hitler's Strawberries (1998)

Actor
 The Great War (1959) - (uncredited)
 The Conjugal Bed (1963) - Igi
 Kiss the Other Sheik (1963) - (segment "L'uomo dei 5 palloni") (uncredited)
 Top Crack (1967)
 Break Up (1968)

Awards and nominations
 1956 Cannes Film Festival (1956) — Short film competition: Best Documentary (La Corsa delle Rocche)
 Oscar (1959) nomination for Best Documentary, Short Subjects (Oeuverture, producer Thorold Dickinson)
 1959 Cannes Film Festival (1959) — nomination for Best Short Film (Paese d'America)
 13th Berlin International Film Festival Golden Bear (1963) (Il diavolo)
 21st Golden Globe Awards (1964) — nomination for Samuel Goldwyn International Award (Il diavolo)

References

External links

1927 births
2000 deaths
Italian film directors
20th-century Italian screenwriters
Italian male screenwriters
Italian male film actors
20th-century Italian male actors
Directors of Golden Bear winners
20th-century Italian male writers